is a Japanese professional golfer.

Kanayama played on the Japan Golf Tour, winning once.

Professional wins (2)

Japan Golf Tour wins (1)

Japan Golf Tour playoff record (1–0)

Other wins (1)
1994 Kansai Open

References

External links

Japanese male golfers
Japan Golf Tour golfers
Sportspeople from Hyōgo Prefecture
1953 births
Living people